The Rugby League World Cup is an international rugby league tournament which has been played at various intervals since 1954. Hat-tricks have been achieved 71 times at the tournament, 70 times with tries and just once with field goals. The first player to do this was Alex Watson, who achieved the feat for Australia against New Zealand in the inaugural tournament. Players who have played for Australia have scored the most hat-tricks with 30 (29 tries 1 field goal), while Papua New Guinea representatives have conceded the most with 11 (all tries).

Hat-tricks are more of a common occurrence in the group stages, as the match-ups usually place higher-ranked teams against lower-ranked teams. Just ten hat-tricks have occurred in the knockout stages, six happening in the quarter-finals and four in the semi-finals. They have been scored by Bryan Fletcher and Robbie Paul in the 2000 tournament, Billy Slater and Johnathan Thurston in the 2008 edition, Jarryd Hayne (twice) and Brett Morris in the 2013 competition, Valentine Holmes (twice) in the 2017 tournament and Josh Addo-Carr in the 2021 edition.

Out of the 70 hat-tricks scored, seven people have achieved the feat twice, these being Ian Schubert, Billy Slater, Akuila Uate, Manu Vatuvei, Jarryd Hayne, Suliasi Vunivalu, Valentine Holmes and Josh Addo-Carr. 15 people have scored an additional try on top of the hat-trick. Holmes and Addo-Carr have scored five tries in a single game, whilst Holmes is the only player to score six tries in a single game. Four players have scored hat-tricks while being on the losing side, these being Bob Fulton, Ian Schubert, Damien Blanch and Chris Taripo. Billy Smith is the only player to score a hat-trick of field goals, doing so for Australia against France in the 1968 tournament.

Hat-tricks

Tries

Field goals

Multiple hat-tricks

Hat-tricks by each national team

References 

World Cup hat-tricks
Hat-tricks
Lists of rugby league hat-tricks